National Route 188 is a national highway of Japan connecting Iwakuni, Yamaguchi and Kudamatsu, Yamaguchi in Japan, with a total length of 67.7 km (42.07 mi).

References

National highways in Japan
Roads in Yamaguchi Prefecture